Many of the diseases, pathogens and pests that affect the tea plant (Camellia sinensis) may affect other members of the plant genus Camellia.

Bacterial diseases

Fungal diseases

Nematodes, parasitic

Lepidoptera (butterflies and moth) pests

References 

 Common Names of Diseases, The American Phytopathological Society

Tea
 
Camellia